Keith Bodner (born 1967 in North Vancouver, British Columbia) is one of the preeminent scholars of the Old Testament in Canada. He currently teaches at Crandall University in Moncton, New Brunswick and Briercrest College and Seminary in Caronport, Saskatchewan.

Early life 
Raised in British Columbia, Keith Bodner received his higher education in Canada and the United Kingdom. He received a BA in Politics and English from the University of Manitoba, an MA in Theological Studies from Regent College, a PhD in the Hebrew Bible and Literary Criticism from the University of Aberdeen in Scotland, and a PhD in Intertextuality and Renaissance Drama from the University of Manchester in England.

Career 
Bodner began teaching at the University of Aberdeen, and then began full-time teaching as an assistant professor, later an associate professor, at Tyndale University College and Seminary in Toronto, winning that school’s Faculty Award for Research Excellence in 2005. He then left to take a position as professor of religious studies at Atlantic Baptist University, later Crandall University, where he was given the Stuart E. Murray Chair of Biblical Studies and awarded the Stephen and Ella Steeves Excellence Awards in Teaching (2011) and Research (2008 and again in 2017).

Along the way, Bodner lectured at Regent College (1999 and 2008), Briercrest Seminary (2000 and 2017–18), and McMaster Divinity College (2002–10) in Canada, and at Wuhan University and Fudan University in China (2012).

Bodner has served on PhD committees at Claremont Graduate University, the University of Sydney, and the University of Toronto. He chaired a section of the Society of Biblical Literature ("Bakhtin and the Biblical Imagination," 2006-11), sits on the editorial board of the Journal for the Study of the Old Testament, and has served the Canadian Society of Biblical Studies as executive secretary since 2013.

Bodner is the author of several dozen refereed journal articles and book chapters, and dozens more conference papers and reviews. He has authored a dozen monographs on various texts of the Old Testament, and is one of only two members of the Canadian Society of Biblical Studies to twice receive its annual R. B. Y. Scott Book Award (2009 and 2013).

Authored Books

References

External links 
 Crandall University faculty page

Canadian evangelicals
1967 births
Living people
University of Manitoba alumni
Regent College alumni
Alumni of the University of Aberdeen
Alumni of the University of Manchester
Academic staff of Tyndale University College and Seminary
Old Testament scholars
Canadian biblical scholars
People from North Vancouver